Gostičaj is a village in the municipalities of Foča, Republika Srpska and Foča-Ustikolina, Bosnia and Herzegovina.

The villages population consists mostly of Muslims. The village was destroyed by Serbs in May 1992 and a few of the Bosniak inhabitants were massacred.

Demographics 
According to the 2013 census, its population was 4, all Bosniaks living in the Foča-Ustikolina part, thus none living in the Republika Srpska part.

References

Populated places in Foča
Populated places in Foča-Ustikolina